This is a list of events that took place in 2022 relating to television in the United Kingdom.

Events

January

February

March

April

May

June

July

August

September

October

November

December

Debuts

BBC

ITV

Channel 4

Channel 5

Sky

Other channels

Channels and streaming services

New channels

New streaming services

Defunct channels/streaming services

Rebranding channels/streaming services

Television programmes

Changes of network affiliation

Returning this year after a break of one year or longer

Continuing television programmes

1920s

1930s

1950s

1960s

1970s

1980s

1990s

2000s

2010s

2020s

Ending this year

Deaths

See also 
 2022 in the United Kingdom
 2022 in British music
 2022 in British radio
 List of British films of 2022

References